Donetsk Raion is a prospective raion (district) of Donetsk Oblast, Ukraine. It was formally created in July 2020 as part of the reform of administrative divisions of Ukraine. The center of the raion is in the city of Donetsk. Population:  The area of raion is controlled by the Donetsk People's Republic, which continues to use the old, pre-2020 administrative divisions of Ukraine.

References

Raions of Donetsk Oblast
Ukrainian raions established during the 2020 administrative reform